Onychostoma laticeps is a species of cyprinid in the genus Onychostoma. It inhabits China and Vietnam.

References

laticeps
Cyprinid fish of Asia
Freshwater fish of China
Fish of Vietnam
Fish described in 1896
Taxa named by Albert Günther